This is a list of individuals currently serving in the House of Representatives of Nigeria (as of the 9th National Assembly).

Leadership

Presiding officers

Majority leadership

Minority leadership

Zonal membership
:

Vacancies 

 Oron/Mbo/Okobo/Udung Uko/Urue Offong/Oruko (Akwa Ibom State): Nse Ekpenyong died on 23 April 2022. The by-election will be held on a to be determined date.
 Egor/Ikpoba-Okha (Edo State): Jude Ise-Idehen died on 1 July 2022. The by-election will be held on a to be determined date.

Members

Abia State

Adamawa State

Akwa Ibom State

Anambra State

Bauchi State

Bayelsa State

Benue State

Borno State

Cross River State

Delta State

Ebonyi State

Edo State

Ekiti State

Enugu State

Federal Capital Territory

Gombe State

Imo State

Jigawa State

Kaduna State

Kano State

Katsina State

Kebbi State

Kogi State

Kwara State

Lagos State

Nasarawa State

Niger State

Ogun State

Ondo State

Osun State

Oyo State

Plateau State

Rivers State

Sokoto State

Taraba State

Yobe State

Zamfara State

Notes

References

House of Representatives
Nigeria